Plymouth Regional High School (PRHS) is a public high school in Plymouth, New Hampshire, United States. Surrounding towns that attend PRHS are Plymouth, Ashland, Holderness, Campton, Rumney, Wentworth, Warren, Ellsworth, Waterville Valley and Thornton. Bruce Parsons is the current principal. The facility, opened in 1970, is located on Old Ward Bridge Road in Plymouth. It also housed Plymouth Elementary School until 1990. Plymouth Regional was known as Plymouth Area High School until 1991. The school colors are navy blue and white.

School district
The school is a part of the Pemi-Baker Regional School District, which houses Plymouth Regional High School and the Pemi-Baker Academy, an alternative school. Both schools are governed by a 13-member school board, elected at large by the voters in the member communities and providing proportional representation for those communities in the financing and governing of the high school. The Pemi-Baker Regional School district belongs to SAU (School Administrative Unit) 48, which also oversees the elementary schools in Plymouth, Holderness, Rumney, Campton, Waterville Valley, Thornton, and Wentworth. Warren and Ashland are not part of the same SAU.

Enrollment
As of fall 2014, there were 684 students enrolled in Plymouth Regional High School. There were 177 freshmen, 168 sophomores, 167 juniors and 172 seniors. Plymouth also accepts students from Newfound Regional High School for Career Technical Education program. They offer up  Auto Mechanics, Health Science, and Culinary Arts. There are currently 23 CTE students from Newfound who attend Plymouth.

Student activities
Student activities at PRHS include many clubs, a national honor society chapter, a competitive theatre program, an award-winning chapter of YMCA's Youth and Government program, and a student senate.

Athletics

Football
Plymouth's football team (Division II) is currently coached by Christopher Sanborn, who has been the head coach since 2014. The previous coach, Chuck Lenahan, won 20 state championships during his 43-year tenure as head football coach at Plymouth. On September 13, 2008, Lenahan recorded his 300th win. The Bobcats owned the nation's longest winning streak (57) until the streak was snapped by Kennett High of Conway on September 18, 2010. Plymouth also owned a 46-game winning streak from 2000–2004. Lenahan is regarded as one of the great high school football coaches of all-time and he is the winningest high school football coach of all-time in the New England region. During Lenahan's final season as head coach in 2013, he led the Bobcats to an 11–1 record and a second straight state championship. Lenahan officially retired with an overall record of 356–70–1. Lenahan is also one of only eight New England area coaches to reach 300 wins in their career. The coaches and their number of wins are listed below:

Chuck Lenahan – 356 wins – Plymouth (NH) (1971–2013)
Rod Wotten – 342 wins – Marshwood (ME), and St. Thomas Aquinas (NH) (1963–2010)
Ed McCarthy – 332 wins – West Haven (CT) and St. Joseph (CT) (1971–2014)
Ken LaChapelle – 329 wins – Northbridge (MA) (Active) (1976–Present)
Armond Colombo – 322 wins – Archbishop Williams (MA) and Brockton (MA) (1960–2003)
Bill Mignault – 321 wins – Ledyard (CT) and Waterford (CT) (1959–1963, 1966–2007)
Lou Marinelli – 319 wins – New Canaan (CT) (1976–Present)
Bill Broderick – 304 wins – Cambridge Rindge & Latin (MA), Haverhill (MA) and Salem (MA) (1908–1942, 1949)
Important Alumni: 
Mike Boyle – went on to be a captain at UNH, also coaches for Plymouth as of present. 
Bryan Mayhew – went on to play at UNH 
Timmy Farina – went on to play at UNH 
Jeff Beckley – went on to kick at Boston College
Jared Keaul – went on to be a captain at UNH
Kyle Reisert – went on to be a Captain at UNH
Doug Dicenzo – a military captain, who risked his life, and died in Afghanistan. 

Football Accomplishments
State Champions – 1951, 1967, 1969, 1972, 1975, 1977, 1980, 1994, 1997, 1998, 2000, 2001, 2002, 2003, 2005, 2006, 2007, 2008, 2009, 2012, 2013, 2016, 2017, 2018
Undefeated Seasons – 1972, 1977, 1980, 1998, 2000, 2001, 2002, 2003, 2005, 2006, 2007, 2008, 2009, 2012, 2017, 2018

Soccer
The primary feeder club of the junior varsity and varsity levels is the Pemi-Baker Soccer Club. A small number of student athletes are also involved in US Soccer's Olympic Development Program and state teams.

Wrestling
Plymouth's wrestling team is currently coached by Randy Cleary and Todd Austin and has won nine state championships as of 2014-2015.

Notable alumni
Eliza Coupe, actress

References

External links
Official website

Schools in Grafton County, New Hampshire
Public high schools in New Hampshire
Plymouth, New Hampshire